The rock band Blind Faith, composed of Steve Winwood, Eric Clapton, Ginger Baker and Rick Grech played a small number of gigs in England, Scandinavia and the United States between June and August 1969. The first gig, on 7 June at Hyde Park, London was witnessed by 100,000 fans. This was followed by a series of dates in Scandinavia through the rest of the month, followed by a US tour starting in Madison Square Garden on 12 July. The US tour continued until the group's final concert on 24 August in Hawaii, after which the group split.

List of concerts

References
Citations

Sources

External links
 Blind Faith's Concert Performances - fansite

1969 concert tours